Jericho Ridge is an upcoming survivalist thriller, written and directed by Will Gilbey, (in his directorial debut), and starring Nikki Amuka-Bird alongside Michael Socha, Zack Morris and Solly McLeod.

Synopsis
Trapped without support, a small town cop finds her remote Sheriff's Office being targeted by a drug cartel in North Washington state.

Cast
 Nikki Amuka-Bird as Tabby Temple
 Olivia Chenery as Dakota
 Philipp Christopher as Carter 
 Solly McLeod as Deputy Walter Judge 
 Zachary Hart as Arnie Boo 
 Aidan Kelly as Tap Shannon 
 Simon Kunz as Sheriff Eddie Reynolds
 Zack Morris as Monty Temple
 Michael Socha as Earl Macready
 Capital T as Kreshnik
 Alex Tate as Bob Peck
 Pippa Winslow as Pam De Luca

Production
Marking Will Gilbey’s feature length directorial debut, the project was announced as starting principal photography in March 2022 with Nikki Amuka-Bird starring. Production was by Silver Lining Productions and DLNQNT with Alex Tate and Harvey Ascott producing with Besnik Krapi and Mark O’Sullivan and Richard Caleel executive producing. Filming had been planned to take place in Canada in March 2020 but was delayed by the COVID-19 pandemic. Ultimately the nine-week shoot took place in and around Prishtina, Kosovo and the national park. In March 2022 it was confirmed to be English actor Zack Morris’ first feature role.

Release
Brilliant Pictures secured world sales rights as filming wrapped in May 2022.

External links

References

Films shot in Kosovo
Films set in Washington (state)
2020s English-language films
Films impacted by the COVID-19 pandemic
Upcoming directorial debut films
Upcoming films